Papel Pampa Municipality is the second municipal section of the Gualberto Villarroel Province in the  La Paz Department, Bolivia. Its seat is Papel Pampa.

References 

 Instituto Nacional de Estadistica de Bolivia

Municipalities of La Paz Department (Bolivia)